"Break the Silence" is the debut and winning single of South African Idol co-winner Jason Hartman. The single was available for digital download via the Nokia Music Store on 4 May 2009. It entered major South African radio charts with healthy debuts.

Formats

CD 
"Break the Silence" (3:28)
"(Everything I Do) I Do It for You" (Live Version)

Digital single 
"Break the Silence" (single)

Charts 

2009 debut singles
2009 songs